The Battlers is a 1994 Australian mini series about two drifters during the Great Depression, based on the novel of the same name by Kylie Tennant.

Cast

 Gary Sweet - Snow Grimshaw
 Jacqueline McKenzie - Dancy Smith
 Marcus Graham - Busker
 Peter Stonham - Jimmy
 Audine Leith - Dora Chester-Phipps
 Richard Piper - Apostle
 Amanda Cross - Millie
 Anne Phelan - Ma Tyrell

References

External links
The Battlers at IMDb
The Battlers at AustLit

Seven Network original programming
English-language television shows
Television shows based on Australian novels
1990s Australian television miniseries
1994 Australian television series debuts
1994 Australian television series endings